FC Slavia Mozyr (FK Slavija Mazyr) is a Belarusian football team, based in Mozyr, Belarus.

History
The team was founded in 1987 as Polesie Mozyr. Between 1987 and 1991, they played in the Belarusian SSR league. From 1992 till 1995, they played in the Belarusian First League. They changed their name to MPKC Mozyr since the 1994–95 season. MPKC stands for the Mozyr Industrial-Commercial Center. They won the First League the same year and made their debut in the Belarusian Premier League in fall 1995 season.

They finished second in 1995 and won the championship in 1996, becoming the first team other than Dinamo Minsk to win it. After changing their name to Slavia Mozyr in 1998, they again finished second in 1999 and won the title in 2000. After that, the results deteriorated and in 2005 they finished last and were relegated.

After the relegation, they had to merge with ZLiN Gomel in order for both teams to survive in any form due to financial problems. The new team went through a number of name changes before arriving with the current name, FC Slavia Mazyr.

Name changes
 1987: Founded as FC Polesye Mozyr
 1994: Renamed FC MPKC Mozyr
 1998: Renamed FC Slavia Mozyr
 2006: Merged with ZLiN Gomel and renamed FC Mozyr-ZLiN
 2007: Renamed FC Mozyr
 2008: Renamed FC Slavia Mozyr

Honours
 Belarusian Premier League
 Winners (2): 1996, 2000
 Runners-up (2): 1995, 1999

 Belarusian First League
 Winners (3): 1994–95, 2011, 2018
 Runners-up (3): 1992–93, 1993–94, 2014

 Belarusian Cup
 Winners (2): 1995–96, 1999–00
 Runners-up (2): 1998–99, 2000–01

Current squad
As of March 2023

League and Cup history

1 Including additional game (2–1 win) for the 13th place, which was necessary as Slavia-Mozyr gained the same number of points as Spartak Shklov while only one team should be relegated.

Slavia in European Cups

Managers
 Anatoliy Yurevich (1993–1997)
 Aleksandr Bubnov (1997–1998)
 Aleksandr Kuznetsov (1998–2000)
Vlad Petrovich (1998–2000)
 Pavel Radnyonak (2001–02)
Aleksandr Prazhnikov (2002–03)
 Vladimir Kurnev (2003–04)
 Andrei Sosnitskiy (2004–05)
Aleksandr Belan (2005)
Ilia Karp (2005)
Ihar Fralov (2006)
Vyacheslav Shevchyk (2008)
 Sergey Yasinsky (2008–09)
Vyacheslav Shevchyk (2009)
 Vitaliy Pavlov (2009)
 Yury Maleyew (2010–14)
 Yuri Puntus (2014–17)
 Mikhail Martinovich (2018–)

References

External links
Official website

 
Football clubs in Belarus
1987 establishments in Belarus
Association football clubs established in 1987